Eckley is an area in Contra Costa County, California, which served as a train-ferry landing for crossings of the Carquinez Strait prior to the opening of the Benicia-Martinez railroad bridge.

The place's name is in honor of Commodore John L. Eckley who established a yacht harbor at the cove here.

References

External links
Aerial view in Google Maps
Port Costa — on Carquinez Strait.

Ghost towns in the San Francisco Bay Area
Carquinez Strait
Former settlements in Contra Costa County, California
Former populated places in California